The 1997–98 Santosh Trophy was the 54th edition of the Santosh Trophy, the main State competition for football in India. It was held between 16 and 27 April 1998 in Guwahati, Assam. In the final, Bengal beat Goa 1–0 in a repeat of the previous edition's final. It was their fifth consecutive win and 28th overall.

Group stage

Group A

Group B

Knockout stage

Semi-finals

Final 
Bengal and Goa headed into their fifth Santosh Trophy final with the former winning every previous encounter, except the 1982–83 edition when the two were declared joint winners.

Awards 
Winners Bengal won a cash prize of 2.5 lakh, while runners-up Goa received 1.5 lakh. The losing semi-finalists Maharashtra and Punjab received 1 lakh each. The awards included:

 Top-scorers: Srikanta Dutta (Bengal), Francis Silveira (Goa); four goals each
 Best goalkeeper: Prasanta Dora (Bengal)
 Best player: Rajesh Kumar (Punjab)
 Fairplay Trophy: Punjab

References

External links 
 

1997–98 in Indian football
Santosh Trophy seasons